David Wagner (born 19 October 1971) is a German-American professional football manager and former player who is the current head coach of EFL Championship club Norwich City.

Wagner grew up in West Germany and made his professional debut with Eintracht Frankfurt in 1990 and played as a striker for several clubs in the first and second divisions of German football. The son of an American stepfather and German mother, Wagner played for the United States national team, earning eight caps between 1996 and 1998.

From 2011 to 2015, he managed Borussia Dortmund II. Wagner left in November 2015 to take the manager's position at Huddersfield Town, whom he led to the Premier League via the 2017 EFL Championship play-off Final. He left Huddersfield in January 2019, and then had brief spells at Bundesliga club Schalke 04 and Swiss Super League club Young Boys.

Early life and club career
Wagner was born in Frankfurt, West Germany. His biological father is from Thailand, his mother is German. Before his birth, Wagner's mother married an American.

Wagner was a journeyman striker for his playing career, playing primarily for Mainz 05, Darmstadt 98, FC Gütersloh, and Schalke 04. He also had short stint at Waldhof Mannheim, Eintracht Frankfurt and TSG Weinheim and Germania Pfungstadt. He enjoyed his best spell at Mainz scoring 19 times in his four years at the club. Former teammate and lifelong friend Jurgen Klopp recalled that "he wasn't very consistent, even if he does not want to hear it... He was a big talent, but not every day. He was a very young player when he came from Eintracht Frankfurt to Mainz, a very skilled boy, very quick, a good striker." He was part of the Schalke squad that won the 1997 UEFA Cup.

International career 
In the mid-1990s, Wagner was one of several German-born players called up by United States men's national soccer team coach Steve Sampson due to their ancestry, along with Thomas Dooley and Michael Mason. Wagner made his debut in a friendly 3–1 win over El Salvador in Los Angeles on 30 August 1996, in which he was substituted at half-time for Brian McBride. He made five appearances the following year and two more in 1998, all but one as a starter.

In April 1997, after Canada lost to the United States in a World Cup qualifying match in which Wagner played, the Canadian Soccer Association complained to FIFA that Wagner should be ineligible to play for the United States based on his appearances for Germany's youth teams. On 2 May 1997, FIFA announced that Wagner was eligible to play for the United States because his games with the German teams were exhibitions, not official matches. However, Wagner was rarely called into the U.S. team afterwards and he was not named to the squad for the 1998 FIFA World Cup.

Managerial career

Borussia Dortmund II
Following his playing career, Wagner became a manager, working mostly with his former 1. Mainz 05 teammate Jürgen Klopp. Wagner was appointed as Borussia Dortmund II manager with effect from 1 July 2011. He left the role on 31 October 2015, amid rumours that he was going to join Klopp's backroom staff at Liverpool.

Huddersfield Town

On 5 November 2015, Wagner was appointed manager of English club Huddersfield Town following the departure of Chris Powell. He brought Christoph Bühler, who had left Borussia Dortmund on 1 November 2015, with him as his assistant.

In the summer of 2016, Wagner brought in 13 players from across the continent, including Danny Ward, Chris Löwe, and Aaron Mooy. He took his players on a bonding tour of Sweden, where they had to survive with only basic equipment for a few days. The team's success in the early 2016–17 season was largely accredited to the squad's tight bond, something that Wagner claimed was a direct result of this Sweden trip. A few weeks later, they visited Austria and kept two clean sheets in matches against Bundesliga teams Werder Bremen and Ingolstadt 04. After an unbeaten start to the 2016–17 season, Huddersfield were top of the table at the start of September, including a win at St James' Park against Newcastle United. Wagner was the EFL Championship Manager of the Month for August 2016 and February 2017.

On 29 May 2017, Huddersfield secured promotion to the Premier League for the 2017–18 season, following a victory on penalties in the play-off final against Reading. On 30 June 2017, Wagner signed an improved two-year contract. He was praised for his achievements in keeping Huddersfield in the Premier League at the end of the 2017–18 season, a feat regarded by bookmakers as improbable and described by The Guardian as "the Premier League's greatest survival story", with Wagner in particular noted as "a leader of rare charisma and intelligence."

On 14 January 2019, Wagner and Huddersfield Town agreed to terminate his contract by mutual consent, with the team in last place and eight points from safety.

Schalke 04
On 9 May 2019, Wagner was appointed as manager of Bundesliga club Schalke 04 on a three-year contract until 30 June 2022. In the second half of the 2019–20 season, Schalke set a new club record of 16 league games without a win between 25 January and 27 June 2020. The winless streak continued with an 0–8 defeat against Bayern Munich in the first match of the 2020–21 season. After a 3–1 defeat against Werder Bremen, the 18th winless league match in a row, Wagner was sacked on 27 September 2020.

Young Boys
In the summer of 2021, Wagner was heavily linked with the vacant manager's position at recently relegated Championship club West Bromwich Albion, however talks broke down. On 10 June 2021, he was appointed manager of Swiss Super League reigning champions Young Boys.

On his debut on 24 July, Wagner's team won 4–3 at FC Luzern. Having won three qualifying rounds, the team took part in the UEFA Champions League group stage where they came last with one victory, a 2–1 home win over Manchester United in the opening fixture on 14 September.

Wagner was unable to lead the Bern-based club to a fourth consecutive league title and was dismissed in March 2022. The team were in second place, 15 points behind FC Zürich.

Norwich City
On 6 January 2023, Wagner returned to England when he was appointed head coach of Championship club Norwich City on a twelve-month rolling contract. His first league game as Norwich manager was a 4–0 win against Preston North End at Deepdale.

Career statistics

Player
Club

International

Manager 
As of 18 March 2023

Honours

Player
Schalke 04
UEFA Cup: 1996–97

Manager
Huddersfield Town
EFL Championship play-offs: 2017

Individual
EFL Championship Manager of the Year: 2016–17
Premier League Manager of the Month: August 2017
EFL Championship Manager of the Month: August 2016, February 2017

References

External links

1971 births
Living people
German people of Thai descent
German people of American descent
Footballers from Frankfurt
German footballers
American sportspeople of Thai descent
American soccer players
Association football forwards
Eintracht Frankfurt II players
Eintracht Frankfurt players
1. FSV Mainz 05 players
FC Schalke 04 players
FC Gütersloh 2000 players
SV Waldhof Mannheim players
SV Darmstadt 98 players
Bundesliga players
2. Bundesliga players
Regionalliga players
UEFA Cup winning players
Germany youth international footballers
Germany under-21 international footballers
United States men's international soccer players
German football managers
American soccer coaches
Borussia Dortmund II managers
Huddersfield Town A.F.C. managers
FC Schalke 04 managers
BSC Young Boys managers
Norwich City F.C. managers
3. Liga managers
English Football League managers
Premier League managers
Bundesliga managers
Swiss Super League managers
German expatriate football managers
German expatriate sportspeople in England
German expatriate sportspeople in Switzerland
American expatriate soccer coaches
American expatriate sportspeople in England
American expatriate sportspeople in Switzerland
Expatriate football managers in England
Expatriate football managers in Switzerland
West German footballers